William Whitmore Greenway (5 March 1798, Nuneaton, Warwickshire – 28 May 1868, Mount Bosworth, Leicestershire) was an English amateur cricketer who played first-class cricket from 1819 to 1820 for Cambridge University Cricket Club, making 3 known appearances.

Life
William Greenway was educated at Rugby School and Trinity Hall, Cambridge. He subsequently became ordained as an Anglican clergyman.

References

External links

Bibliography
 Arthur Haygarth, Scores & Biographies, Volume 1 (1744–1826), Lillywhite, 1862

1798 births
1868 deaths
English cricketers
English cricketers of 1787 to 1825
Cambridge University cricketers
People educated at Rugby School
Alumni of Trinity Hall, Cambridge
19th-century English Anglican priests